Disley railway station serves the village of Disley in Cheshire, England. The station, and all trains serving it, are operated by Northern Trains.

Facilities
The station has a staffed ticket office, though this is only open during morning peak periods (07:10–10:10).  At other times, tickets must be bought on the train or prior to travel.  Train running information is available via telephone, automated announcements and CIS displays, though waiting facilities are limited to shelters on each side (other buildings, including the former station house and signal box having been demolished).  Step-free access to both platforms is available via ramps and sloping paths from Buxton Road West.

Service
There is a generally an hourly service each day to Manchester Piccadilly northbound and to Buxton southbound, with additional services at peak periods. The Sunday service here is also hourly each way.

References

External links

Railway stations in Cheshire
DfT Category E stations
Former London and North Western Railway stations
Railway stations in Great Britain opened in 1857
Northern franchise railway stations
1857 establishments in England